= Wrong Milanti =

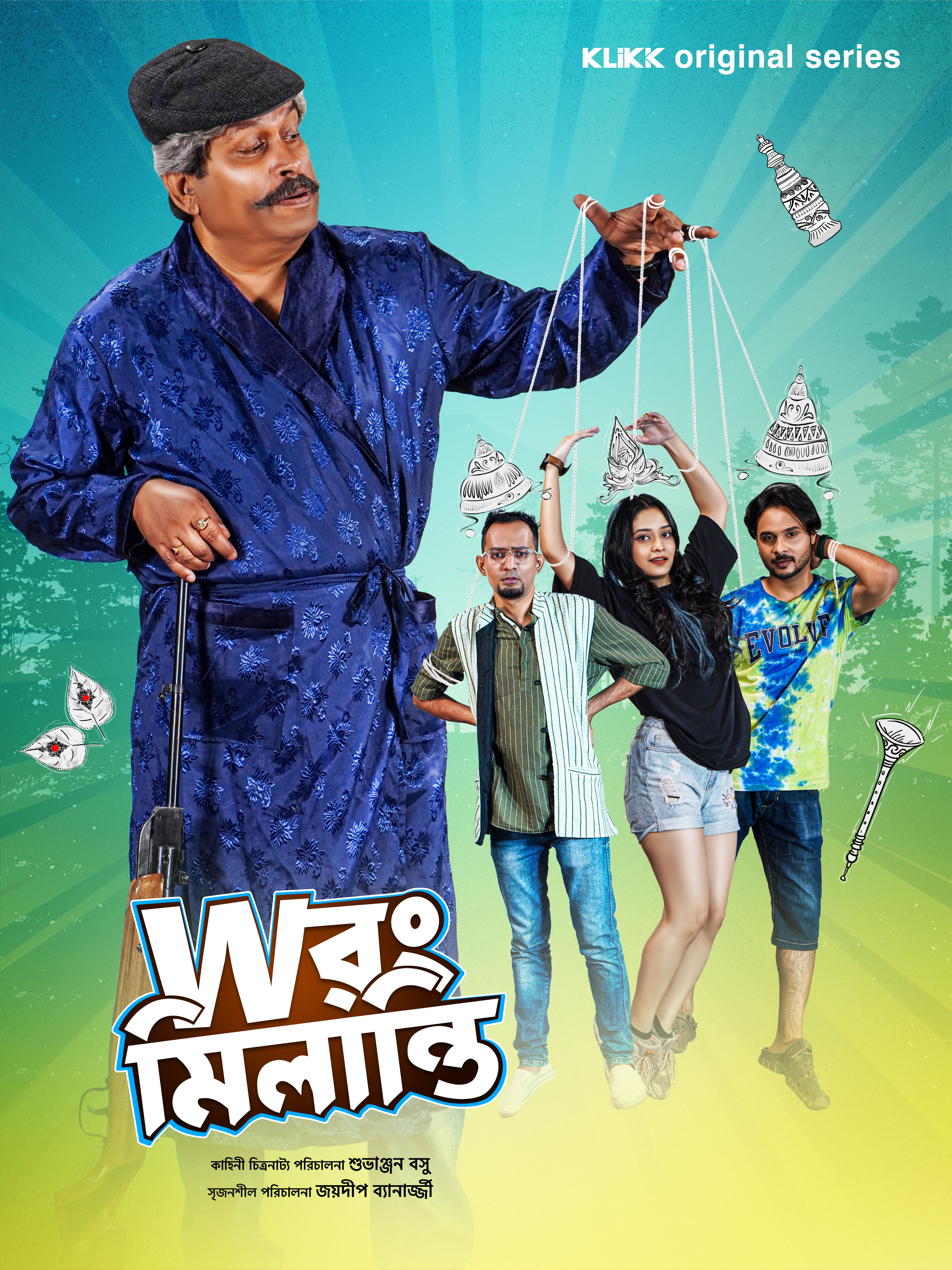
- Genre: Romance, Comedy
- Written by: Subhanjan Basu
- Directed by: Subhanjan Basu
- Starring: Sabuj Bardhan, Sandip Bhattacharya, Durbar Sharma, Piya Debnath, Disha Bhattacharjee
- Music by: Pranjal Das
- Country of origin: India
- Original language: Bengali
- No. of seasons: 1
- No. of episodes: 5

Production
- Producer: Santanu Chatterjee
- Cinematography: Ritam Ghoshal

Original release
- Release: 20 June 2023

Wrong Milanti is a 2023 Indian Bengali language romance and comedy web series written and directed by Subhanjan Basu. Santanu Chatterjee is the producer.

The series starring Sabuj Bardhan, Sandip Bhattacharya, Durbar Sharma, Piya Debnath and Disha Bhattacharjee. are in the main cast.

== Synopsis ==
Wrong Milanti is a love story about four teenagers. Surya, the main character, is a quiet, everyday guy. He has a job and makes enough money to support his parents. Surya's life is quite wonderful, except he can't locate a girl for his marriage. In reality, it would be more appropriate to state that his best friend Shawon forbids him from marrying. He neither falls in love with any lady nor allows Surya to find a life partner. Shawon is afraid of losing their bachelorhood, which results in 67 failed marriage proposals for Surya. Meanwhile, Hiya is an open-minded, independent young woman who has no desire to settle down so soon in life. She is currently residing in Calcutta and does not wish to return to her hometown due to her father's constant pressure over her marriage. She declines every proposition, which makes her father nervous. Surya and Hiya eventually meet because to a marriage proposal. Surya falls in love with Hiya's younger sister Jhilik at his first visit to her home, mistaking her for Hiya.

== Cast ==
- Sandip Bhattacharya as Cornel Sengupta
- Sabuj Bardhan as Shaon Chatterjee
- Piya Debnath as Hiya Sengupta
- Durbar Sharma as Surjo Chatterjee
- Disha Bhattacharjee as Jhilik Sengupta

== Episodes ==
No.	Title	Directed by	Original release date
1	"Saat Pake Bandha"	Subhanjan Basu	20 June 2023
Shaon, Surjo's greatest friend, has already annulled 68 of his marriages. Is Surjo's marriage to Hiya his final attempt?
2	"Biyer Phool"	Subhanjan Basu	20 June 2023
Surjo has already done the marketing for the marriage, while Shaon has fallen in love with Hiya.
3	"Shwasurbari Zindabad"	Subhanjan Basu	20 June 2023
Surjo was in one room, while Shaon and Hiya's new family was in another. Colonel father-in-law arrived at his son-in-law's residence to put an end to this wonderful day.
4	"Bibaha Abhijan"	Subhanjan Basu	20 June 2023
Surjo has been fantasising about Jhilik all day, while Shaon and Hiya are shackled by their commitments.
5	"Finally Bhalobasa"	Subhanjan Basu	20 June 2023
The two couples live happily ever after.

== Soundtrack ==
Kajol Chatterjee, Alaap Bose sing the song and also composed the music in the series.

No.	Title	Singer(s)	Length
1	Bhalobasha Mane	Kajol Chatterjee, Alaap Bose	02:52
		Total Length	02:52
